The 2010 MBC Drama Awards is a ceremony honoring the outstanding achievement in television on the Munhwa Broadcasting Corporation (MBC) network for the year of 2010. It was held on December 30, 2010 and hosted by Kim Young-man and actress Lee So-yeon.

Nominations and winners
(Winners denoted in bold)

References

External links
http://www.imbc.com/broad/tv/ent/event/2010mbc/

MBC Drama Awards
MBC Drama Awards
MBC Drama Awards